Shawkat Hossain Hiron was a Bangladesh Awami League politician and member of parliament for Barisal-5.

Early life
Hiron was born on 15 October 1956 in Patuakhali, East Pakistan, Pakistan.

Career
Hiron joined the Jatiya Party (Ershad) in 1986. He joined Bangladesh Awami League 1997. He became the president of the Barisal City unit of the Bangladesh Awami League in 2012.
 He was elected Mayor of Barisal City 4 August 2008. He lost the reelection of Barisal Mayoral election on 15 June 2013. He was elected member of parliament from Barisal-5 on 5 January 2014 uncontested.

Personal life
Hiron was married to Jebunnesa Afroz.

Death and legacy
Hiron died on 9 April 2014 in Apollo Hospital Dhaka, Bangladesh. By elections were called in his constituency, Barisal-5, after his death. Bangladesh Awami League nominated his wife, Zebunnesa Afroz, to contest the Barisal-5 by elections. She won the by-election and was elected to parliament.

References

Awami League politicians
1956 births
2014 deaths
10th Jatiya Sangsad members